The Samuel Landes House is a historic house in Columbus, Ohio, United States. The house was built c. 1848 and was listed on the National Register of Historic Places in 1987. The house is significant as a vernacular farmhouse. It was built for Samuel Landes, a prominent farmer in the area, and remained in his family until 1875.

See also
 National Register of Historic Places listings in Columbus, Ohio

References

Houses completed in 1848
National Register of Historic Places in Columbus, Ohio
Houses in Columbus, Ohio
Houses on the National Register of Historic Places in Ohio
Colonial Revival architecture in Ohio